Phong Hòa may refer to several rural communes in Vietnam, including:

Phong Hòa, Đồng Tháp, a commune of Lai Vung District
Phong Hòa, Thừa Thiên-Huế, commune of Phong Điền District, Thừa Thiên-Huế Province

See also
Phong Hóa, a commune of Tuyên Hóa District in Quảng Bình Province